The Uniontown Coal Barons were a Pennsylvania–Ohio–Maryland League (1906–1907), Pennsylvania–West Virginia League (1908–1909 and 1914) and Middle Atlantic League (1926, 1947–1949) baseball team based in Uniontown, Pennsylvania. From 1947 to 1949, they were affiliated with the Pittsburgh Pirates.

Under manager James Groninger, they won a league championship in 1906. Under manager Frank Sisley they won a league championship in 1909.

In 1926, the team was called simply Uniontown in 1914 and the Uniontown Cokers in 1926.

References

Baseball teams established in 1906
Defunct minor league baseball teams
Pennsylvania-West Virginia League teams
Fayette County, Pennsylvania
Defunct baseball teams in Pennsylvania
Baseball teams disestablished in 1949
Pittsburgh Pirates minor league affiliates
1906 establishments in Pennsylvania
1949 disestablishments in Pennsylvania
Middle Atlantic League teams